NU'EST W was the second subunit of South Korean boy band, NU'EST. The group consisted of NU'EST members, JR, Aron, Baekho, and Ren, promoting in the absence of Minhyun, who at the time was promoting with Wanna One. The group disbanded on December 31, 2018, following the return of Minhyun.

History

Predebut: Produce 101 Season 2
For the first half of 2017, NU'EST members JR, Baekho, Ren, and Minhyun, participated in Produce 101 Season 2. Minhyun placed 9th, thus resulting in his debut in the winning group, Wanna One. Due to his absence, NU'EST promoted as a four-member special unit, NU'EST W, until Minhyun returned. The "W" stands for "wait", meaning that the group will wait for Minhyun to return. It also contains a second meaning of them having waited a long time to greet fans again following periods of inactivity.

2017: Debut
NU'EST W released their debut EP W, Here with the lead single "Where You At" on 10 October 2017. The EP was well received, and they earned their first music show win with "Where You At" on 19 October 2017 on M! Countdown. The following day, NU'EST W won first place on Music Bank. Since its release, sales of W, Here have surpassed 200,000 copies, making NU'EST W the fourth K-pop group to reach 200,000 copies sold in one week, and the only unit group to do so. In October 2017, NU'EST W became models for the outdoor clothing company BLACKYAK's campaign, "Art of the Youth".

On 23 December 2017, NU'EST W contributed to the soundtrack of A Korean Odyssey with "Let Me Out", which is their first Korean drama song since their debut.

2018: Who, You, Wake, N, and disbandment
In anticipation of the release of the album Who, You, Pledis Entertainment launched a one-day ad campaign for NU'EST W in New York City's Times Square to both promote the upcoming album and thank fans. On 25 June 2018, NU'EST W released their second EP, Who, You, and began promoting the lead single titled "Dejavu". Following its release, "Dejavu" topped three major Korean music charts. They first performed "Dejavu" at their album showcase on 25 June 2018.

On August 26, 2018, NU'EST W released an OST entitled "AND I" for the historical romance drama Mr. Sunshine. The "AND I" OST achieved #1 on Mnet, Naver Music & Soribada charts. On October 1, 2018,  NU'EST W and NC Soft's character brand, Spoonz , released a collaboration song called "I Don't Care."   NU'EST W together with their labelmate Seventeen became brand ambassadors of a fried chicken restaurant franchise Nene Chicken.

On November 8, Gaon Chart announced that EP Who, You received the official platinum certification. Receiving a platinum certification  means that the album reached 250,000 sales.

On November 26, NU'EST W released their final EP as a unit group Wake, N with the title song "Help Me". "Help Me" topped domestic music charts including Naver and Soribada. They earned their first win for "Help Me" on Music Bank on December 7. The group disbanded following Minhyun's return from Wanna One.

Discography

Extended plays

Singles

Other charted songs

Concerts and tours

Fanmeeting

2017 NU'EST W FANMEETING 'L.O.Λ.E & DREAM'

Concert Tour

Special Mini Concert 2017

Double You

Awards and nominations

Notes

References

 
2017 establishments in South Korea
K-pop music groups
Musical groups established in 2017
Musical groups from Seoul
Pledis Entertainment artists
South Korean boy bands
South Korean dance music groups
South Korean synthpop groups